Denis-Pierre-Jean Papillon de la Ferté  (Châlons-en-Champagne 17 February 1727 — Paris 7 July 1794) was a connoisseur of art and an administrator (an Intendant and from 1763 the sole Intendant) of the Menus-Plaisirs du Roi, the organization in the royal household (the Maison du Roi) that was responsible for the design and presentation of fêtes and ceremonies, weddings and funerals, at the court of France, beginning with his appointment in 1756. Even after the coming of the Revolution, he was retained until 1792, to oversee the more overtly Republican events of what had always been political as well as cultural statements ; in producing them, the conflicts among the dukes who were Gentilhommes de la Chambre, to whom Papillon de la Ferté reported and among whom he served as diplomat and peacemaker, also played a role. He was a victim of the Reign of Terror in 1794.

He was the son of Pierre Papillon de la Ferté (ca. 1682–1753), seigneur de la Ferté, président trésorier of the généralité of Champagne, the King's Lieutenant of Châlons. 

His remarkable longevity in a position that was concentrated in his person in 1762, spanning two reigns and the change in taste from rococo to neoclassicism, in music as well as the visual arts, is testament to his ability and character. His Journal, published in 1887, gives an insight not only into the workings of the Menus-Plaisirs, but the Comédie française and the Comédie-Italienne, and also the music at court and the Opéra, and the Intendant 's role, reforming, rationalizing and redefining the official structure, encouraging artists of every kind, the model of the modern arts administrator.

He was inspired to keep the journal by which he is intimately known in support of his possible future self-defence, a "preservative against the Bastille" as he would jokingly remark to the Premiers Gentilhommes de la Chambre to whom he reported, reassuring them that otherwise it would never see the light of day, for he entered his position following the scandal of malfeasance of his predecessor, M. de Curis.

Notes

References
Gruber, Alain-Charles, Les Grandes Fêtes et leurs Décors à l'Époque de Louis XVI (Geneva: Droz) (Geneva) 1972. passim

External links

1727 births
1794 deaths
French civil servants
French theatre managers and producers
French people executed by guillotine during the French Revolution